Appendicula, commonly known as stream orchids or 牛齿兰属 (niu chi lan shu), is a genus of flowering plants in the family Orchidaceae. Orchids in this genus are epiphytic, lithophytic or rarely terrestrial plants herbs with many flat, often twisted leaves and small resupinate, white or greenish flowers. The sepals are free from each other but the lateral sepals and labellum are fused to the base of the column.

The genus Appendicula was first formally described in 1825 by Carl Ludwig Blume who published the description in Bijdragen tot de flora van Nederlandsch Indië. The name Appendicula is the diminutive form of the Latin word appendix meaning "appendage" or "addition", hence "little appendage", referring to the "inward-facing appendages on the labellum".

Orchids in the genus Appendicula occur from tropical and subtropical Asia to the western Pacific.

List of species 
The following is a list of species of Appendicula accepted by the World Checklist of Selected Plant Families as at January 2019:
 
 Appendicula aberrans Schltr.
 Appendicula adnata J.J.Sm.
 Appendicula alatocaulis P.O'Byrne & J.J.Verm.
 Appendicula alba Blume
 Appendicula anceps Blume
 Appendicula anceps var. anceps.
 Appendicula anceps var. celebica Schltr.
 Appendicula ancosiphila Ormerod
 Appendicula anemophila (Schltr.) J.J.Sm.
 Appendicula angustifolia Blume
 Appendicula annamensis Guillaumin
 Appendicula anomala (Schltr.) Schltr.
 Appendicula babiensis J.J.Sm.
 Appendicula baliensis J.J.Sm.
 Appendicula biloba J.J.Sm.
 Appendicula biloba var. angustifolia J.J.Sm.
 Appendicula biloba var. biloba.
 Appendicula bilobulata J.J.Wood
 Appendicula biumbonata Schltr.
 Appendicula bracteata (Schltr.) J.J.Sm.
 Appendicula bracteosa Rchb.f. in B.Seemann
 Appendicula brassii Ormerod
 Appendicula brevimentum J.J.Sm.
 Appendicula buxifolia Blume
 Appendicula calcarata Ridl.
 Appendicula calcicola Schltr.
 Appendicula callifera J.J.Sm.
 Appendicula carinifera Schltr.
 Appendicula carnosa Blume
 Appendicula celebica (Schltr.) Schltr.
 Appendicula chalmersiana F.Muell.
 Appendicula clemensiae (Ames) Ames
 Appendicula clemensiorum J.J.Wood
 Appendicula collina (Schltr.) J.J.Sm.
 Appendicula concava Schltr.
 Appendicula congenera Blume
 Appendicula congesta Ridl.
 Appendicula cornuta Blume
 Appendicula crispa J.J.Sm.
 Appendicula cristata Blume
 Appendicula crotalina (Ames) Schltr.
 Appendicula cuneata Ames
 Appendicula cyphochiloides Ormerod
 Appendicula dajakorum J.J.Sm.
 Appendicula damusensis J.J.Sm.
 Appendicula dendrobioides (Schltr.) Schltr.
 Appendicula densifolia (Ridl.) Ridl.
 Appendicula dichaeoides Ormerod
 Appendicula disticha Ridl.
 Appendicula djamuensis Schltr.
 Appendicula effusa (Schltr.) Schltr.
 Appendicula elegans Rchb.f.
 Appendicula elmeri (Ames) Ames
 Appendicula fallax Schltr.
 Appendicula fasciculata J.J.Sm.
 Appendicula fenixii (Ames) Schltr.
 Appendicula fergussoniana Ormerod
 Appendicula flaccida (Schltr.) Schltr.
 Appendicula floribunda (Schltr.) Schltr. 
 Appendicula foliosa Ames
 Appendicula fractiflexa J.J.Wood
 Appendicula furfuracea J.J.Sm.
 Appendicula gjellerupii J.J.Sm.
 Appendicula goodenoughiana Ormerod
 Appendicula gracilis Aver.
 Appendicula grandifolia Schltr.
 Appendicula hexadens Ormerod
 Appendicula hexandra (J.König) J.J.Sm. 
 Appendicula hooglandii Ormerod
 Appendicula humilis Schltr.
 Appendicula imbricata J.J.Sm.
 Appendicula inermis Carr
 Appendicula infundibuliformis J.J.Sm.. 
 Appendicula irigensis Ames
 Appendicula jacobsonii J.J.Sm.
 Appendicula kaniensis Schltr.
 Appendicula kjellbergii J.J.Sm.
 Appendicula krauseana Schltr.
 Appendicula lamprophylla Schltr.. 
 Appendicula latifolia (Schltr.) J.J.Sm.
 Appendicula latilabium J.J.Sm.
 Appendicula latilabium var. latilabium.
 Appendicula latilabium var. seramica J.J.Sm.
 Appendicula laxifolia J.J.Sm.
 Appendicula leytensis Ames
 Appendicula linearifolia Ames & C.Schweinf.
 Appendicula linearis J.J.Sm.
 Appendicula longa J.J.Sm.
 Appendicula longibracteata Ridl.
 Appendicula longirostrata Ames & C.Schweinf.
 Appendicula lucbanensis (Ames) Ames
 Appendicula lucida Ridl.
 Appendicula lutea Schltr.
 Appendicula luzonensis (Ames) Ames
 Appendicula magnibracteata Ames & C.Schweinf.
 Appendicula malindangensis (Ames) Schltr. 
 Appendicula maneauensis Ormerod
 Appendicula maquilingensis Ames 
 Appendicula matapensis Ormerod
 Appendicula merapohensis P.T.Ong & P.O'Byrne
 Appendicula merrillii Ames
 Appendicula mimica Ormerod
 Appendicula montana (Schltr.) J.J.Sm.
 Appendicula negrosiana (Ames) Ames
 Appendicula nicobarica Jayanthi, Sumathi & Karthig.
 Appendicula nivea (Schltr.) Schltr.
 Appendicula oblonga Schltr.
 Appendicula ovalis (Schltr.) J.J.Sm. ex Mansf.
 Appendicula oxysepala (Schltr.) J.J.Sm.
 Appendicula padangensis Schltr.
 Appendicula palustris J.J.Sm.
 Appendicula pandurata (Schltr.) Schltr.
 Appendicula parvifolia (Schltr.) J.J.Sm.
 Appendicula patentissima J.J.Sm. 
 Appendicula pauciflora Blume
 Appendicula pendula Blume
 Appendicula penicillata Blume
 Appendicula perplexa (Ames) Ames
 Appendicula peyeriana Kraenzl.
 Appendicula pilosa J.J.Sm.
 Appendicula pilosa var. pilosa.
 Appendicula pilosa var. sumatrana J.J.Sm.
 Appendicula podochiloides J.J.Sm.. 
 Appendicula polita J.J.Sm.
 Appendicula polyantha Ames
 Appendicula polyphylla Schltr.
 Appendicula polystachya (Schltr.) Schltr.
 Appendicula pseudofractiflexa J.J.Wood
 Appendicula pseudopendula (Schltr.) Schltr.
 Appendicula purpurascens Blume
 Appendicula purpureifolia J.J.Sm.
 Appendicula ramosa Blume
 Appendicula recondita J.J.Sm.
 Appendicula reflexa Blume
 Appendicula reflexa var. cycloglossa (Schltr.) Schltr.
 Appendicula reflexa var. kotoensis (Hayata) T.P.Lin
 Appendicula reflexa var. reflexa.
 Appendicula rivularis (Schltr.) J.J.Sm.
 Appendicula rostellata J.J.Sm.
 Appendicula rostrata J.J.Sm. 
 Appendicula rubens (Schltr.) Schltr.
 Appendicula rupestris Ridl.
 Appendicula salicifolia J.J.Sm.
 Appendicula scissosaccus (Gilli) Ormerod
 Appendicula sepikiana Schltr.
 Appendicula seranica J.J.Sm.
 Appendicula spathilabris J.J.Sm. 
 Appendicula steffensiana (Schltr.) J.J.Sm.
 Appendicula tagalensium Kraenzl. 
 Appendicula tembuyukenensis J.J.Wood
 Appendicula tenuifolia J.J.Wood
 Appendicula tenuifolia var. filiformis J.J.Wood
 Appendicula tenuifolia var. tenuifolia.
 Appendicula tenuispica (Schltr.) Schltr.
 Appendicula theunissenii J.J.Sm.
 Appendicula togarupia Ormerod
 Appendicula topensabe Ormerod
 Appendicula torricelliana Schltr.
 Appendicula torta Blume
 Appendicula triloba (Schltr.) Schltr.
 Appendicula tubilabia J.J.Wood
 Appendicula uncata Ridl.
 Appendicula uncata subsp. sarawakensis J.J.Wood
 Appendicula uncata subsp. uncata. 
 Appendicula undulata Blume
 Appendicula uncata subsp. sarawakensis J.J.Wood
 Appendicula uncata subsp. uncata.
 Appendicula vanimoensis Ormerod
 Appendicula verruculifera J.J.Sm.
 Appendicula wariana (Schltr.) Ormerod
 Appendicula weberi Ames
 Appendicula werneri Schltr.
 Appendicula xytriophora Rchb.f

References

External links 

Podochileae genera
Orchids of China
Orchids of Thailand
Orchids of Vietnam
Orchids of Malaysia
Orchids of the Philippines
Orchids of Indonesia
Orchids of New Guinea
Orchids of Vanuatu
Flora of the Southwestern Pacific
Flora of the Caroline Islands
Eriinae